Pejkovac is a village in the municipality of Žitorađa, Serbia. According to the 2009 census, the village has a population of 5276 people.

References

Populated places in Toplica District